Delta Force Football Club is a football team based in Asaba, Delta State, Nigeria. They play at Jay Jay Okocha Stadium.

History
The State bought over an amateur slot in 2003 and gained promotion to the then Second Division within a season.. They ended their 2009 season in fifth place of the Nigeria National League after challenging for promotion the whole season. They were disbanded by the Delta State government for lack of funds after the 2009 season but eventually reinstated to their slot in the league. They were similarly disbanded in 2008 after players protested lack of funds, but the state agreed to bring them back for the 2008-09 season.

They were resurrected again in 2015 and played in the Nigeria National League.
In March 2019 they bought the slot of Kada City F.C. and took over Kada's schedule in the NPFL eleven games into the season. Kada City took over Delta's spot in the NNL.

Current squad
As of 31 March 2019

Former players
 Emmanuel Emenike

References

 
Sport in Delta State
Association football clubs established in 2001
2001 establishments in Nigeria
Football clubs in Nigeria